Expocentre is a Russian exhibition and conference company staging international trade shows in Russia, the CIS countries, Central Europe, and also Russian national pavilions at EXPOs (World Fairs). It owns and operates Expocentre Fairgrounds, an exhibition venue located in the Central Administrative Area of Moscow. The company headquarters is in Moscow.

History 

In 1959 Sokolniki Park in Moscow hosted the first national exhibition of US industrial products, opened by Nikita Khrushchev and Richard Nixon. From the Soviet side, the show had been coordinated by the Department for Foreign Exhibitions of the USSR Chamber of Commerce. The Department was later turned into the Agency for International and Foreign Exhibitions in USSR.

In 1964 Expocentre produced its first international trade show called Stroidormash (the Road-Building Machinery Show) which put on display the latest road-building machinery and equipment. It had been co-organized by the National Committee for Construction, Road-Building and Utilities Engineering under the USSR Ministry of Construction.

Name 
The company name Expocentre was registered in 1977, as the Agency for International and Foreign Exhibitions in USSR had been turned into the Expocentre Company (a National Company since 1980).

Timeline 

 In 1945 a new committee was set up within the USSR Chamber of Trade, called a Standing Committee on Exhibitions, and in 1947 on its basis a Department for Foreign Exhibitions (the Exhibitions Department since 1949) was established.
 In 1969 the USSR Chamber of Commerce set up the Agency for International and Foreign Exhibitions consisting of the Department for Foreign Exhibitions, Department for International Exhibitions and other units. 
 In 1991, Expocentre became a joint stock company.

Facilities 

Expocentre has nine exhibition pavilions, and multifunction halls.

Directors 

 1959–1964 Aleksandr V. Saag 
 1964–1970 Konstantin I. Smolyaninov 
 1970–1977 Khachik G. Oganesyan  
 1973–1977 Aleksandr K. Pavlenko 
 1977–1979 Lev K. Garusov 
 1979–1984 Vladimir M. Korsikov 
 1984–1990 Stanislav V. Mikhailov 
 1990–2002 Igor S. Denisov 
 2002–2012 Vladislav L. Malkevich  
 2012-present Present Sergei S. Bednov

Partners  

Expocentre cooperates with many international exhibition companies and groups.

References

External links
 Expocentre ZAO
 Expocentre ZAO jubilee website

Trade fair venues
Companies based in Moscow
Event management companies of Russia